Thomas Robert Hamilton Havens (born 21 November 1939) is an American Japanologist.

Havens is from Chambersburg, Pennsylvania, and graduated from Princeton University in 1961 with a Bachelor of Arts degree in history, followed by a master's degree from the University of California, Berkeley in 1962. He remained at Berkeley to earn a doctorate in history in 1965, and began his teaching career at Connecticut College. While on the Connecticut College faculty, he was awarded a Guggenheim fellowship in 1976. Havens joined the University of Illinois faculty in 1990, where he taught for two years before accepting a teaching position at Berkeley. Havens served as a faculty member for his alma mater for six years, then in 1999, moved to Northeastern University.

Selected publications

References

1939 births
Living people
American Japanologists
20th-century American historians
21st-century American historians
Historians of Japan
Connecticut College faculty
University of Illinois faculty
Northeastern University faculty
University of California, Berkeley faculty
University of California, Berkeley alumni
20th-century American male writers
21st-century American male writers
Princeton University alumni
People from Chambersburg, Pennsylvania
Historians from Pennsylvania